The High Bailiff is a legal position held within the Isle of Man. The High Bailiff is the head stipendiary magistrate.

The current High Bailiff is Her Worship Jayne Hughes, who took office on 11 March 2019.

The High Bailiff and their deputy are appointed by the Lieutenant Governor. The High Bailiff and Deputy High Bailiff are ex officio judicial officers of the High Court of Justice of the Isle of Man and coroners of inquests.

Originally there was a High Bailiff of each of the four towns of the island: Castletown, Ramsey, Peel and Douglas. In 1911 the offices of High Bailiff of Castletown and Douglas, and the offices of High Bailiff of Peel and Ramsey, were merged. Those offices were merged in turn in 1933 to form a single office of High Bailiff of the Isle of Man.

Deputy High Bailiffs
Unknown, 1933–1977
Weldon Williams, 1977–1988
Andrew Williamson, 1988–1995
Michael Moyle, 1995–2002
Alastair Montgomerie, 2002–2011
Jayne Hughes, 2011
Christopher Arrowsmith, 2019
James Brooks, 2021

See also
Bailiff
Bailiff (Channel Islands)
Manx Judiciary

References

Manx law
Government occupations
Region-specific legal occupations
Judiciary of the Isle of Man